Mount Oxford is located on Ellesmere Island, Nunavut, Canada and was named for the University of Oxford.

It was not until 1957, when it was climbed for the second time during the International Geophysical Year that an accurate height was obtained.

References

External links
Mount Oxford at Index Mundi
Mount Oxford at Peakbagger

Oxford, Mount
Two-thousanders of Nunavut